"I'm Lucky" is a song written and recorded by British singer-songwriter Joan Armatrading, released as a single from her seventh studio album, Walk Under Ladders (1981). The single peaked at No. 46 on the UK Singles Chart, with its highest placing being No. 42 on the Dutch Top 40.

B-side 
The single featured as its B-side the original song "Shine", which remained unreleased on an album until the reissue of Walk Under Ladders.

Charts

References

External links
 

1981 singles
Joan Armatrading songs
Songs written by Joan Armatrading
1981 songs
A&M Records singles
Song recordings produced by Steve Lillywhite